"Church" is a song written, produced, and performed by American rapper and singer T-Pain. It is a fast-paced song led by guitar riffs and is one of the songs where T-Pain raps. It appears on his album Epiphany  (2007) and was released as the third single. The song "features" Teddy Verseti, one of T-Pain's aliases, which he uses when rapping vigorously. The song is about wanting to fight someone following a confrontation at a club. It was confirmed as the third single from Epiphany in an interview promoting the album.

The 'Future Presidents' remix is used for the official video. It was featured on 106 & Park on October 22, 2007 as the "New Joint of the Day". The song is also featured on the Step Up 2: The Streets soundtrack.

In the UK, "Church" eventually reached a peak of No. 35, two weeks after the physical release of the song. The single also peaked at No. 7 on the New Zealand RIANZ charts, and was also certified gold there.

Track listing
UK CD
 "Church" (featuring Teddy Verseti) (main version - explicit)
 "Buy U a Drank (Shawty Snappin')" (remix) (featuring Kanye West) (main version - explicit)

iTunes EP
 "Church" explicit
 "Church" revised clean - without gunshots
 "Church" instrumental

Charts

Weekly charts

Year-end charts

Certifications

References

Further reading
 T-Pain interview by Pete Lewis, 'Blues & Soul' February 2008

2007 songs
2007 singles
Music videos directed by Bryan Barber
T-Pain songs
Song recordings produced by T-Pain
Songs written by T-Pain
Jive Records singles
Konvict Muzik singles